Fred (nicknamed Fredzilla) is a fictional character appearing in American comic books published by Marvel Comics. He is a member of the superhero team Big Hero 6.

The character appears in the 2014 animated film Big Hero 6 and the video game Kingdom Hearts III, voiced by T.J. Miller and in the subsequent animated series by Brooks Wheelan. This version of him is a man of European descent who is a comic book fan that wears a dragon suit that breathes fire.

Publication history
The character was created by Chris Claremont and David Nakayama and first appeared in Big Hero 6 #1 (September 2008). He along with Wasabi-No-Ginger were meant to serve as replacements for then current members Sunpyre and Ebon Samurai.

Fictional character biography

Nicknamed Fredzilla, it is revealed that he is descended from the Ainu, a group of indigenous people of Japan and that he spent time growing up on a secret S.H.I.E.L.D. base in Japan.

Powers and abilities
Fred can transform into a Godzilla-like Kaiju. In addition, he can manifest the aura of his Kaiju form that can only be seen from certain perspectives.

Reception 
 In 2020, CBR.com ranked Fred 9th in their "Marvel Comics: Ranking Every Member Of Big Hero 6 From Weakest To Most Powerful" list.

In other media

Film

Fred appears in the Walt Disney Animation Studios 2014 animated film Big Hero 6, voiced by T. J. Miller. In the film, he is depicted as a Caucasian comic book fan who works as the mascot at the San Fransokyo Institute of Technology. Speaking of Miller, co-director Chris Williams said "He's a real student of comedy. There are a lot of layers to his performance, so Fred ended up becoming a richer character than anyone expected." In much of the promotional materials, Fred initials his last name as "L.".

Fred considers himself a "major science enthusiast" and is always asking his friends to build and design things that are outside the laws of probability. Fred has a blue dragon suit built for him by Hiro which allows him to leap great distances and shoot fire. During the movie Fred's friends learn that he is actually incredibly wealthy, and he provides the secret base (his huge house), financial support, and necessary training for them to become superheroes. In the post-credits scene, Fred accidentally opens a secret door in his home, in which he finds superhero costumes and equipment. Fred then finds out these belong to his father (voiced by Stan Lee and animated in his likeness), a retired superhero, when he unexpectedly returns from his vacation. As they embrace each other, he says that he and Fred have much to talk about.

Television
Fred appears in Big Hero 6: The Series, voiced by Brooks Wheelan. In the first episode, "Baymax Returns", Fred reveals his full name as Frederick Flamarian Frederickson IV (retconning the promotional material). He pushes the team to continue crime fighting and he comes up with the name "Big Hero 6." Fred is shown to be very much aware of his own screw ups and in "Fred's Bro-Tillion" made every attempt to succeed in pleasing his mother who by the end accepts Fred's quirks. The nickname "Fredzilla" is uttered for the first time when he refers to himself as such starting in "The Impatient Patient". Despite being employed at SFIT, Fred does not have an access card like any of the students do. In the episode "Mini-Max", it is shown that Fred has an uncontrollable destructive side when no one is fighting crime with him, resulting in Hiro designing a "sidekick" (really a nanny of sorts) named Mini-Max. The episode reveals that he is arachnophobic to the point that he tenses up. However, it is also shown that he is capable of inducing contradictory postulation as he took out a defective defense system by inquiring what it meant for it to attack a threat when the threat could potentially be itself.

In season two, Fred gets a new chameleon outfit dubbed "Fredmeleon" which allows him to cling to walls, use an adhesive and elongated tongue and gives him the ability to become invisible. On the downside, the outfit does not give him super jump like his main suit. The episode "Major Blast" reveals that Fred has a toy car stuck in his ear since he was eight and it is implied to be the cause of much of his clumsiness. In the same episode, it is heavily implied that he has ADHD due to him constantly getting distracted and going off on tangents. In season three, Fred gains a love interest in the form of Olivia Mole, the cousin to his archenemy Richardson Mole.

Video games
Fred makes an appearance along with the rest of Big Hero 6 in Kingdom Hearts III. He is given the ability to both use fire and freeze breath.

References

External links
 Fredzilla at Marvel Wiki
 Fredzilla at Comic Vine

Big Hero 6 characters
Characters created by Chris Claremont
Comics characters introduced in 2008
Fictional Ainu people
Fictional characters from Hokkaido
Fictional college students
Japanese superheroes
Kaiju
Marvel Comics characters who are shapeshifters
Marvel Comics characters with superhuman strength
Marvel Comics superheroes
Teenage characters in comics
Teenage superheroes